John Thurston (born April 17, 1948) is an American college basketball coach. He was the head coach of the St. Francis College women's basketball team from 2012 to 2018. Thurston was born in the Bronx, New York and is an alumnus of Archbishop Molloy High School and Seton Hall University. Through both high school and college, Thurston was a two sport player playing baseball and basketball. After graduating high school in 1966, Thurston was drafted by Los Angeles Dodgers in the 1966 MLB Amateur Draft.

Coaching career
Thurston is one of only a few coaches who has been a head coach at the NCAA DI, DII, DIII and NAIA levels in 26 years of coaching men's college basketball from 1971 to 1997. Thurston started out as an assistant basketball coach of men's basketball at Fairleigh Dickinson University's Florham Campus in 1971. Then from 1972 to 1975, he served as the FDU-Florham Devil's head coach. Thurston next served as an assistant to Lou Campanelli at James Madison University, and was promoted to head coach in 1985.  With the Dukes, Thurston helped lead the team to three straight trips to the NCAA tournament from 1981 to 1983, and was named Colonial Athletic Association Coach of the Year in 1987.  In 1988, he moved to Wingate University as athletic director and head men's basketball coach.

Thurston then began coaching women's basketball. From 2003 to 2005, he was the top assistant at the University of North Carolina at Wilmington, and in 2005, became the head coach at Northwood University, as the first head coach of the women's program.  In two seasons with Northwood, he led the Lady Seahawks to two Florida Sun Conference titles, a trip to the NAIA national tournament, and was named Coach of the Year in 2008. After the 2008 season, Thurston resigned from Northwood and became an assistant at Fordham University for two years. In 2010, Thurston was hired as an assistant coach by then Terriers head coach Brenda Milano for the St. Francis Brooklyn Terriers women's basketball program.

In 2012, Thurston was named the head coach of the Terriers women's basketball program. His 2013–14 squad set the program record for wins in a season with 19.  The following year, his 2014–15 squad won the NEC tournament and participated in the NCAA tournament, the first in the program's history. After the 2017–18 season Thurston retired from coaching the St. Francis Terriers women's basketball team.

Head coaching record

Men's

Women's

References

External links
 St. Francis Brooklyn profile

1948 births
Living people
American men's basketball coaches
American men's basketball players
American women's basketball coaches
Baseball players from New York (state)
Basketball coaches from New York (state)
Basketball players from New York City
College men's basketball head coaches in the United States
Fairleigh Dickinson–Florham Devils men's basketball coaches
Fordham Rams women's basketball coaches
James Madison Dukes men's basketball coaches
Seton Hall Pirates baseball players
Seton Hall Pirates men's basketball players
Sportspeople from the Bronx
St. Francis Brooklyn Terriers women's basketball coaches
UNC Wilmington Seahawks men's basketball coaches
Wingate Bulldogs men's basketball coaches